The 1999–2000 Red Stripe Bowl was the 26th season of what is now the Regional Super50, the domestic limited-overs cricket competition for the countries of the West Indies Cricket Board (WICB). It ran from 27 October to 7 November 1999.

Eight teams contested the competition – the six regular teams of West Indian domestic cricket (Barbados, Guyana, Jamaica, the Leeward Islands, Trinidad and Tobago, and the Windward Islands), plus two invited international teams from the ICC Americas region (Bermuda and Canada). The tournament was impacted by rain, with three matches (including the final) being interrupted and another three (including a semi-final) being abandoned entirely. Jamaica eventually defeated the Leeward Islands in the final to win their sixth domestic one-day title. Leeward Islands batsman Sylvester Joseph led the tournament in runs, while Guyana's Neil McGarrell took the most wickets.

Squads

Group stage

Zone A

Zone B

Finals

Semi-finals

Final

Statistics

Most runs
The top five run scorers (total runs) are included in this table.

Source: CricketArchive

Most wickets

The top five wicket takers are listed in this table, listed by wickets taken and then by bowling average.

Source: CricketArchive

See also
 1999–2000 Busta Cup

References

Red Stripe Bowl
West Indian cricket seasons from 1970–71 to 1999–2000
Regional Super50 seasons
Red Stripe Bowl
Red Stripe Bowl
Red Stripe Bowl